Promised Woman is a 1975 Australian film from director Tom Cowan.

Plot
Antigone arrives in Sydney from Greece to have an arranged marriage with Telis, but is rejected by him as he expected a younger woman. Telis's older brother, Manolis, sympathises with Antigone.

Cast
Yelena Zigon as Antigone
Takis Emmanuel as Manolis
Nikos Gerissimou as Telis
Kate Fitzpatrick as Marge
Darcy Waters as Ken
Carmel Cullen as Helen
George Valaris as Nick
Alex Alexandrou as Basil
Thea Sevastos as Elpitha
Christos Lazanis as best man

Production
Tom Cowan had long been interested in the experiences of Greek migrants in Australia, previously making the short Helena of Sydney. He got the idea from making a film about a bride brought to Australia without ever having met the man she would marry from a Greek journalist.

The script was based on a play by Greek writer Theo Patrikareas, which had first been performed in 1963. (Patrikareas had also been involved in Helena of Sydney). A number of changes were made from the original play, including adding and removing certain characters, and opening it up instead of setting it all in the one location.

Cowan says the funds were raised relatively easily because there was a distribution circuit of Greek cinemas at the time. They often showed films in black and white and Cowan was going to make the film in black and white but the Australian Film Development Corporation offered twice the money if it was in colour and English.

Cowan originally wanted Irene Papas to play the lead but she was unavailable, so imported Yelena Zigon from Yugoslavia. Takis Emmanuel was brought over from Greece but the rest of the actors were locals, several from the Hellenic Theatre Company.

The movie was shot on 35mm with the budget mostly coming from the Australian Film Development Corporation. Cowan used a small crew of 14 technicians including several recruits from the Australian Film, Television and Radio School such as Gillian Armstrong and Graham Shirley. Shooting began early in March 1974 and took three weeks on location in Sydney. In April, a small unit flew to Greece to film some scenes of Antigone's home life.

Kate Fitzpatrick had injured her leg before making the film, meaning she was in great pain during the shoot.

Release
The film was premiered at an arts festival in Canberra in March 1975. Following this there were some reshoots, including changing the ending: originally Antigone married Telis but this was adjusted so that she ended alone. The movie subsequently achieved a limited commercial release.

The play was revived in 2001.

References

External links

Promised Woman at Oz Movies

1970s English-language films